The British Steel Tour was a 1980 concert tour by English heavy metal band Judas Priest where the band toured in Europe and North America from 7 March to 23 August 1980 in support of their 1980 album British Steel.

Background
During the United Kingdom leg, the band was supported by Iron Maiden, who were touring in support of their self-titled debut album.

Setlist

Songs played
"Hell Bent for Leather"
"Delivering the Goods"
"The Ripper"
"Metal Gods"
"Running Wild"
"Living After Midnight"
"White Heat, Red Hot"
"Sinner"
"Beyond the Realms of Death"
"Diamonds & Rust" ("Joan Baez" cover)
"You Don't Have to Be Old to Be Wise"
"Exciter"
"Grinder"
"Victim of Changes"
"Steeler"
"Genocide"
"Breaking the Law"
"Tyrant"
"The Green Manalishi (With the Two Prong Crown)" ("Fleetwood Mac" cover) [encore]
"Starbreaker" [encore]
"Take on the World" [encore]

Typical setlist
"Hell Bent for Leather"
"The Ripper"
"Running Wild"
"Living After Midnight"
"Sinner"
"Beyond the Realms of Death"
"You Don't Have to Be Old to Be Wise"
"Grinder"
"Victim of Changes"
"Genocide"
"Tyrant"
"The Green Manalishi" ("Fleetwood Mac" Cover) [encore]

Europe

Europe songs played
"Hell Bent for Leather"
"Delivering the Goods"
"Running Wild"
"The Ripper"
"Living After Midnight"
"White Heat, Red Hot"
"Beyond the Realms of Death"
"Sinner"
"The Green Manalishi (With the Two Prong Crown)" (Fleetwood Mac cover)
"Grinder"
"Victim of Changes"
"Breaking the Law"
"Genocide"
"Starbreaker" [encore]
"Take on the World" [encore]
"Tyrant" [encore]

Europe Typical setlist
"Hell Bent for Leather"
"Delivering the Goods"
"Running Wild"
"The Ripper"
"White Heat, Red Hot"
"Beyond the Realms of Death"
"Sinner"
"The Green Manalishi (With the Two Prong Crown)" (Fleetwood Mac cover)
"Victim of Changes"
"Genocide"
"Starbreaker" [encore]
"Tyrant" [encore]

Europe typical setlist
"Hell Bent for Leather"
"Delivering the Goods"
"Running Wild"
"The Ripper"
"White Heat, Red Hot"
"Beyond the Realms of Death"
"Sinner"
"The Green Manalishi (With the Two Prong Crown)" (Fleetwood Mac cover)
"Victim of Changes"
"Breaking the Law"
"Genocide"
"Starbreaker" [encore]
"Take on the World" [encore]
"Tyrant" [encore]

Monsters of Rock England (1980)
"Hell Bent for Leather"
"The Ripper"
"Running Wild"
"Living After Midnight"
"Sinner"
"Beyond the Realms of Death"
"You Don't Have to Be Old to Be Wise"
"Grinder"
"Victim of Changes"
"The Green Manalishi (With the Two Prong Crown)" (Fleetwood Mac cover)
"Tyrant"

North America

Songs played
"Hell Bent for Leather"
"The Ripper"
"Metal Gods"
"Running Wild"
"Living After Midnight"
"Sinner"
"Diamonds & Rust" (Joan Baez cover)
"Beyond the Realms of Death"
"Exciter"
"You Don't Have to Be Old to Be Wise"
"Breaking the Law"
"Grinder"
"Victim of Changes"
"Steeler"
"Genocide"
"Tyrant"
"The Green Manalishi (With the Two Prong Crown)" (Fleetwood Mac cover)

Typical Setlist
"Hell Bent for Leather"
"Running Wild"
"The Ripper"
"Living After Midnight"
"Sinner"
"Beyond the Realms of Death"
"You Don't Have to Be Old to Be Wise"
"Grinder"
"Victim of Changes"
"Steeler"
"Genocide"
"Tyrant"
"The Green Manalishi (With the Two Prong Crown)" (Fleetwood Mac cover)

Tour dates

Touring Bands
This show was supported by Iron Maiden
This show was supported by Def Leppard
This show was in support of April Wine
This show was in support of Sammy Hagar
This show was in support of Journey
This show was supported by Scorpions
This show was in support of Heart
This show was supported by Joe Perry
This show was in support of Rainbow
This show was supported by Saxon
This show was supported by Riot
This show was in support of Ted Nugent
This show was in support of Johnny Winter
This show was supported by Molly Hatchet
This show was supported by Wishbone Ash
This show was supported by Ian Gillan

Boxscore

Cancelled dates

Personnel
 Rob Halford – lead vocals
 Glenn Tipton – lead/rhythm guitar, backing vocals
 K.K. Downing – rhythm/lead guitar, backing vocals
 Ian Hill – bass, backing vocals
 Dave Holland – drums

References

Judas Priest concert tours
1980 concert tours